Di Long or Dilong extract is a medicinal preparation based on abdominal extracts from the earthworm species Lumbricus rubellus used in traditional Chinese medicine (TCM) for a wide variety of disorders, from convulsions and fevers to rheumatoid arthritis and blood stasis syndromes.

Synopsis 
Di Long comes in two variants, Guang Di Long native to Guangdong, Guangxi, Fujian and collected from spring to autumn, and Tu Di Long collected during the summer in many regions of China.  The abdomen of an earthworm of the L. rubellus species is cut open immediately after capture, whereupon viscera and extraneous matter are removed.  The abdomen is washed clean, and dried in the sun or indoors at a low temperatures.

It is also used in the treatment of blepharoptosis, or drooping of the upper eyelid, along with other Phlegm Herbs (such as Dan Nan Xing, Jiang Can, Ban Xia, Tian Ma and Bai Fu Zi).

According to TCM, Di Long is associated with the Bladder, Liver, Lung and Spleen meridians, and has Salty and Cold properties.  It is thought to work by draining Liver Heat and by clearing Lung Heat, and also by clearing Heat in the collateral channels.   Its "channel-opening" properties are thought to derive from its habits of burrowing through the earth, constantly searching out new spaces to slither.

Recommended dosage is 4.5 to 12 grams per day as an oral preparation.

References 
 Benskey & Gamble 1986, Chinese Herbal Medicine Materia Medica, Seattle Washington, Eastland Press
 Chen JB, et al. "Chemical composition analysis of Di Long", Journal of Chinese Patented Medicine 1997;19(5):35-36.
 Li Fu Wei, et al.  "One case of Di Long induced cutaneous pruritus", Shaanxi Journal of TCM 2000;21(1):26.
 Li Shu Lan, et al. "Research on Di Long's effect in lowering blood pressure", Journal of Traditional Chinese Medicine Information 1995;12(3):22-24.
 Wang Zhong Wei, et al. "Research advances on earthworm bioengineering technology", Journal of Chinese Materia Medica 2000;31(5):386-389.
 Zhang FC, et al. "Di Long's enhancing effect on macrophages' immune activity", China Journal of Pharmacy 1998;33(9):532-535.
 Tang Ben Sui, et al. "Acute toxicity experiments on lumbricin", Journal of Shizhen Medicine 1999;10(9):652.
 Wang Guang Zhong, et al. "Chemical composition analysis of Di Long related herbal material", Journal of Traditional Chinese Medicine Material 1998;21(3):133-135.
 Chen Jing Bin, et al. "Chemical composition analysis of Di Long", Journal of Chinese Patented Medicine 1997;19(5):35-36.
 Cheng Neng Neng, et al. "Di Long phospholipid structure and platelet activating factor synthesis", Journal of Pharmacy 1992;27(12):886.
 Zhao Xiao Yu, et al. "Analysis of earthworm fibrinolytic enzymes composition", China Journal of Biochemistry and Molecular Biology 1998;14(4):407-411.
 Yang Xi Shu, et al. "Research on part of earthworm's e-PA characteristics", China Journal of Biochemistry and Molecular Biology 1998;14(2):164-169.
 Yan Shu Fang, et al. "Eisenia foetida fibrinolytic enzymes research VIII: determination of fibrinolytic enzymes active components.", Heilongjiang Journal of Medicine 1999;12(5):263-264.
 Hu Sheng, et al. "Determination and comparison of between hypoxanthine from various LU produced and Guan Dong produced Di Long" Journal of Chinese Patented Medicine. 1994;16(1):42-43.
 Li Wei, et al. "Using HPLC to determine quantity of hypoxanthine, xanthine, uracil, and uridyl in Di Long", Journal of Traditional Chinese Medicine Material, 1996;19(12):625-627.
 Tong Zheng Jun. "One case of allergic shock induced by Chinese herb Di Long", Hebei Journal of Integrated Medicine 1996;5(2):50.
 Bo Huang Li, et al. "One report of Di Long induced allergic enteritis", Journal of Shizhen Medicine 1998;9(5):402.
 "One report of allergic reaction caused by Di Long formula injection solution", Journal of Modern Medicine 1972;(7):33.
 Chen Bin Yan, et al. "Analgesic and antipyretic effects of Di Long powder in mice, rats and rabbits", Journal of Shanghai Medical University 1996;23(3):225-226,240.
 Yang Shu Dong, et al. "Fibrinolytic enzymes active components' effects in counteracting coagulation and dissolving thrombus", Journal of Heart, Lung and Vascular Diseases 1997;18(5):252-254.
 Wei Cai Zhi, et al. "Experimental research on earthworm extract fibrinolytic enzymes and its effects in counteracting coagulation", China Journal of Biochemical Medicinal Material 1997;18(5):252-254.
 Guo Bao Zhu, et al. "Experimental research on earthworm extract's effects in killing sperms in vitro and in counteracting Trichomonas vaginalis", Journal of Traditional Chinese Medicine Research 1997;13(4):39-41.
 Zhang Fu Xia, et al. "Experimental research on products from earthworm's body that kills sperms", Shaanxi Journal of TCM 1996;17(5):234-236.
 Zhang Feng Chun, et al. "Di Long's enhancing effect on macrophages' immune activity", China Journal of Pharmacy 1998;33(9):532-535.
 Zhang Feng Chun, et al. "Research into Di Long's mechanism in its recovery effects on rabbit back injury", China Journal of Pharmacy 1999;34(2):93-96.
 Wang Ke Wei. "Forecast of research on anti-cancer effects of Di Long capsules (912)", China Journal of Clinical Research on Tumor 1991;18(3):131-132.
 Geng Xiu Fang, et al. "Effects of Di Long infusion at low temperature on ACE activity" Journal of Traditional Chinese Medicine Information 1997;14(6):38.
 Ju Hyun Cho, et al. "Lumbricin I, a novel proline-rich antimicrobial peptide from the earthworm: purification, cDNA cloning and molecular characterization", Biochim Biophys Acta 1998 Oct 22;1408(1):67-76 
 Mihara H, et al. "A novel fibrinolytic enzyme extracted from earthworm, Lubricus rubellus" J. Physiol. 1991;41, 461-472

External links 
 https://web.archive.org/web/20071206034120/http://articles.directorym.com/Di_Long-a853287.html

Traditional Chinese medicine